Jérôme Gondorf (born 26 June 1988) is a German professional footballer who plays as central midfielder for Karlsruher SC.

Career
Having previously played for Stuttgarter Kickers from 2010 until 2013, Gondorf joined 3. Liga club Darmstadt in 2013 on a two-year contract. With Darmstadt, he achieved back-to-back promotions in 2014 and 2015. In July 2016, he agreed to a contract extension until 2018.

In May 2017, Gondorf signed with Werder Bremen. Werder Bremen reportedly activated a release clause in his contract with Darmstadt by paying a transfer fee of €1.2 million.

In June 2018, SC Freiburg announced Gondorf would join for the 2018–19 season after spending one season at Werder Bremen. The undisclosed transfer fee was estimated at €1.3 million.

On 15 January 2020, Gondorf was loaned out to Karlsruher SC for the rest of the 2019–20 season. Gondorf played 15 games, scored two goals and made two assists, before the club signed him permanently, giving him a contract until the summer 2022. Gondorf was also handed the captains armband, which he took over from David Pisot.

References

External links
 
 

1988 births
Living people
Footballers from Karlsruhe
Association football midfielders
German footballers
Bundesliga players
2. Bundesliga players
3. Liga players
ASV Durlach players
Stuttgarter Kickers II players
Stuttgarter Kickers players
SV Darmstadt 98 players
SV Werder Bremen players
SC Freiburg players
Karlsruher SC players
21st-century German people